The Calgary Rugby Union is the administrative body for rugby union in Calgary.

Teams
 Calgary Canadian Irish Athletic Club 
 Calgary Rams Rugby Club 
 Canucks rugby
 Saints Rugby
 Hornets Rugby
 Highlanders Rugby
 Bow Valley Grizzlies Rugby
 Red Deer Titans Rugby Club
 Calgary Knights Rugby Club

External links
 Calgary Rugby Union official site

Rugby union in Alberta
Sport in Calgary
Rugby union governing bodies in Canada